Isabelle Jongenelen (born 28 July 1991) is a Dutch handball player who plays for Vfl Oldenburg

References

1991 births
Living people
Sportspeople from Breda
Dutch female handball players
Expatriate handball players
Dutch expatriate sportspeople in Germany
Dutch expatriate sportspeople in France
21st-century Dutch women